Red Oak is an unincorporated community located along Richland Creek in Buckeye Township, Stephenson County, Illinois, United States. Red Oak is in Orangeville Community School District.

History
Stephen A. Rigney (180–1947), Illinois state representative and farmer, was born near Red Oak.

References

Unincorporated communities in Illinois
Unincorporated communities in Stephenson County, Illinois